Super Bock Super Rock is a music festival in Portugal, organized yearly since 1995. The festival has been held in various places throughout the years.

1995 
The first edition was held on 8 and 9 July 1995 at the Gare Marítima de Alcântara, in Lisbon.

1996 
The second edition was held between 21 and 23 June 1996 at the Passeio Marítimo de Alcântara, in Lisbon.

1997 
The third edition was held on 4 and 5 July 1997, at the Passeio Marítimo de Algés, in Algés, Oeiras.

1998 
The fourth edition was held on 31 July and 1 August 1997, at the Praça Sony in Lisbon, during the Expo '98 World's Fair.

2004 
In its 10th edition, Super Bock Super Rock returned to the open-air festival format. It was held between 9 and 11 June 2004, at Parque Tejo, in Lisbon.

2005 
The 11th edition was held between 27 and 29 May 2005, at Parque Tejo, in Lisbon.

2006 
The 12th edition was held on 25 and 26 May, and 7 and 8 June 2005, at Parque Tejo, in Lisbon.

2007 

The 13th edition was held on 28 June and between 3 and 5 July 2007, at Parque Tejo, in Lisbon.

2008 

The 14th edition of Super Bock Super Rock was held in July 2008, once again in more than one city. It was held at Estádio do Bessa in Porto on 4 and 5 July 2008, and at Parque Tejo in Lisbon on 9 and 10 July 2008.

2009 

The 15th edition of Super Bock Super Rock had a format similar to the previous year. It took place on 5 July 2009, at the Estádio do Bessa, and in Lisbon on 18 July 2009, at the Estádio do Restelo.

2010 
The 16th edition of Super Bock Super Rock was the first to be held at the Herdade do Cabeço da Flauta, near the Meco beach, in Sesimbra. It took place on 16, 17 and 18 July 2010. There were 3 stages at the event: Palco Super Bock, Palco EDP and @Meco.

2014 
The 20th edition took place at the Herdade do Cabeço da Flauta, near the Meco beach, in Sesimbra, between 16 and 19 July 2014.

2015 
The 21st edition took place at Parque das Nações, in Lisbon, between 16 and 18 July 2015.

2016 
The 22nd edition took place at Parque das Nações, in Lisbon, on 14, 15 and 16 July 2016.

2017 
The 23rd edition took place at Parque das Nações, in Lisbon, on 13, 14 and 15 July 2017.

2018 
The 24th edition took place at Parque das Nações, in Lisbon, on 19, 20 and 21 July 2018.

2019 
The 25th edition took place at the Herdade do Cabeço da Flauta, near the Meco beach, in Sesimbra, between 18 and 20 July 2019.

Cancelled years (2020-2021) 
The 26th edition of Super Bock Super Rock was scheduled to take place on 16, 17 and 18 July 2020, at the Herdade do Cabeço da Flauta. On 15 May 2020, Música no Coração announced that the 26th edition would be postponed to 2021 due to the Portuguese government's decision to prohibit all large-scale events in the country until 30 September 2020, amid the COVID-19 pandemic.

The 26th edition was then planned to take place between 15 and 17 July 2021, in the same location, with all tickets bought for the 2020 edition still valid for the new dates. On 31 May 2021, Música do Coração once again announced the postponement of the festival, justifying the decision with the disruption in international travel still in effect due to the COVID-19 pandemic, which forced many of the scheduled international artists to postpone their tours to 2022.

References 

Super Bock Super Rock
Music festivals in Portugal